The 2019 Australian International Basketball series, was a men's international basketball competition between national teams, scheduled to be held from 23–27 August 2019 in various venues in Australia. The tournament is organized prior to the 2019 FIBA Basketball World Cup hosted by China. The competition is played under FIBA rules. National teams of Australia, Canada, New Zealand, and United States played at the tournament.

Participating teams

Matches

See also 
 2019 Australia FIBA Basketball World Cup team
 2019 Canada FIBA Basketball World Cup team
 2019 New Zealand FIBA Basketball World Cup team
 2019 United States FIBA Basketball World Cup team

References 

 FIBA to live stream preparation games of Australia Canada and New Zealand. FIBA Basketball. 16 August 2019

2019 in New Zealand basketball
2019–20 in Australian basketball
2019–20 in Canadian basketball
2019–20 in American basketball
International basketball competitions hosted by Australia
2019 in Australian sport